The Canadian Army Command and Staff College (CACSC), formerly the Canadian Land Force Command and Staff College, is a school for officers of the Canadian Forces, specializing in staff and army operations courses. It is located at Fort Frontenac, in Kingston, Ontario, Canada.

Courses offered 
CACSC is charged with developing in army officers the ability to perform command and staff functions in war.

The following courses are offered at CACSC:

 Army Operations Course
 Primary Reserve Army Operations Course
 Military Training and Cooperation Program – North Atlantic Treaty Organization
 Unit Command Team Course
 Primary Reserve Unit Command Team Course
 Information Management Officer Course
 Joint Tactical Targeting Course
 Collateral Damage Estimation Course

College commandants 

 Lt Col G.G. Simonds (1941)
 Maj-Gen H.F.H. Hertzberg, CMG, DSO, MC (1941-1944)
 Brig D.G. Cunningham, DSO (1944-1945)
 Brig J.D.B. Smith, CBE, DSO (1945-1946)
 Maj-Gen J.F.M. Whiteley, CB, CBE, MC (1947-1949)
 Lt-Gen G.G. Simonds, CB, CBE, DSO, CD (1949-1951)
 Brig G. Kitching, CBE, DSO, CD (1951-1954)
 Brig M.P. Bogert, CBE, DSO, CD (1954-1958)
 Brig R. Rowley, DSO, ED, CD (1958-1962)
 Brig D.C. Cameron, DSO, ED, CD (1962-1966)
 Brig B.F. Macdonald, DSO, CD (1966)
 Brig W.A. Milroy, DSO, CD (1966-1968)
 BGen W.A. Milroy, DSO, CD (1968-1969)
 BGen D.S. MacLennan, CD (1969-1971)
 BGen F.W. Wootton, CD (1971-1974)
 BGen P.V.B. Grieve, CD (1974-1976)
 BGen C.L. Kirby, CD (1976-1979)
 Col P.H.C. Carew, CD (1979-1980)
 BGen P.H.C. Carew, CD (1980-1982)
 BGen J.A. Cotter, CD (1982-1984)
 BGen R.I. Stewart, CD (1984-1987)
 BGen C. Milner, OMM, CD (1987-1989)
 MGen C. Milner, OMM, CD (1989)
 BGen T.F. De Faye, OMM, CD (1989-1991)
 Col R.S. Billings, CD (1991-1992)
 BGen R.P. Alden, OMM, CD (1992-1994)
 Col J.S. Labbe, CD (1994-1996)
 BGen M.K. Jeffery, OMM, CD (1996-1997)
 BGen J. Arp, CD (1997-1999)
 Col M. Lessard, CD (1999-2000)
 BGen M. Lessard, CD (2000-2001)
 BGen G.W. Nordick, OMM< MSC, CD (2001-2003)
 Col J.R. Ferron, CD (2003-2005)
 Col J.C. Collin, OMM, CD (2005-2007)
 Col F.A. Lewis, MSM, CD (2007-2009)
 Col J. Cade, MSM, CD (2009-2011)
 Col B.W.G. McPherson, CD (2011-2013)
 Col R.D.K. Walker, MSC, CD (2013-1015)
 Col G.R. Smith, MSM, CD (2015-2016)
 LCol J.G.J Trudel, CD (2016)
 Col D.D. Basinger, CD (2016-2018)
 Col D.J. Cross, CD (2018-2019)
 Col R.T. Strickland, CD (2019-2022)
 Col K.L. Solomon, CD (2022 - )

See also
 Fort Frontenac Library
 Fort Frontenac

References

External links 
 

Canadian Armed Forces education and training establishments
Educational institutions established in 1946
1946 establishments in Ontario
Military education and training in Canada
Military academies of Canada
Canadian Armed Forces
Staff colleges